Trilogy 2 is a live album by Chick Corea with Christian McBride and Brian Blade. It was first released in 2018 in Japan on the Universal Music label, and in 2019 by Concord Records. The album is a follow-up to Trilogy, which was issued in 2013.

It won the Grammy Award for Best Jazz Instrumental Album in 2021. The track "All Blues" won for Best Improvised Jazz Solo.

Track listing

Disc one
"How Deep Is The Ocean" (Irving Berlin) – 12:49
"500 Miles High" (Chick Corea) – 11:02
"Crepuscule With Nellie" (Thelonious Monk) – 6:40
"Work" (Thelonious Monk) – 4:54
"But Beautiful" (Jimmy Van Heusen, Johnny Burke) – 9:02
"La Fiesta" (Chick Corea) – 7:11

Disc two
"Eiderdown" (Steve Swallow) – 11:08
"All Blues" (Miles Davis) – 11:35
"Pastime Paradise" (Stevie Wonder) – 8:27
"Now He Sings, Now He Sobs" (Chick Corea) – 16:18
"Serenity" (Joe Henderson) – 7:40
"Lotus Blossom" (Kenny Dorham) – 10:13

Personnel 
Musicians
 Chick Corea - piano
 Christian McBride – bass
 Brian Blade – drums

Production
 Chick Corea - producer
 Bernie Kirsh – co-producer, engineer (recording, mixing)
 Brian Vibberts – engineer (mixing)
 David Ives – engineer (mastering)

 Dan Muse – project manager, photography
 Kris Campbell – tour manager
 Marc Bessant – –graphic design
 Robin D. G. Kelley – liner notes

References 

2018 live albums
Chick Corea live albums
Concord Records live albums
Grammy Award for Best Jazz Instrumental Album